The Long Service Medal (Military) is a decoration awarded to a member of the Singapore Armed Forces (SAF) (regardless of regular or NSmen status) who has completed 25 years of continuous service.

Previously, regular servicemen were eligible for the Pingat Bakti Setia (Long Service Award) in line with other government employees, however NSmen were not eligible.

Description

 The ribbon is white, with a central red stripe and two flanking thin red stripes on either side.

Service medals
In the SAF, the medals for service are:
  5 years - Singapore Armed Forces Good Service Medal
 10 years - Singapore Armed Forces Long Service and Good Conduct (10 Years) Medal
 15 years - Singapore Armed Forces Long Service and Good Conduct (10 Years) Medal with 15 year clasp
 20 years - Singapore Armed Forces Long Service and Good Conduct (20 Years) Medal
 25 years - Long Service Medal (Military)
 30 years - Singapore Armed Forces Long Service and Good Conduct (20 Years) Medal with 30 year clasp

Notable recipients 

 Winston Choo
 Khoo Boon Hui
 Perry Lim
 Neo Kian Hong
 Ng Yat Chung
 Evelyn Norris
 Melvyn Ong
 Ravinder Singh (general)
 Su Guaning
 Ronnie Tay

References
Singapore MINDEF Factsheet: Review of SAF medals
Singaporean Army Medals Factsheet

Military awards and decorations of Singapore
Singapore